Football Live was the name given to the project and computer system created and utilised by PA Sport to collect Real Time Statistics from major English & Scottish Football Matches and distribute to most leading media organisations. At the time of its operation, more than 99% of all football statistics displayed across Print, Internet, Radio & TV Media outlets would have been collected via Football Live.

Background
Prior to implementation of Football Live, the collection process consisted of a news reporter or press officer at each club telephoning the Press Association, relaying information on Teams, Goals and Half-Time & Full Time.

The basis for Football Live was to have a representative of the Press Association (FBA - Football Analyst) at every ground. Throughout the whole match they would stay on an open line on a mobile phone to a Sports Information Processor (SIP), constantly relaying in real time statistical information for every :
 Shot
 Foul
 Free Kick
 Goal
 Cross
 Goal Kick
 Offside

This information would be entered in real time and passed to our media customers.

The Football Live project was in use from Season 2001/02 until the service was taken over by Opta in 2013/14

Commercial Customers
The most famous use for the Football Live data was for the Vidiprinter services on BBC & Sky Sports, allowing goals to be viewed on TV screens within 20 seconds of the event happening.

League competitions
From its inception in 2001/02 season, the following leagues/competitions were fully covered by Football live
 English Premier League
 Championship
 League One
 League Two
 Conference
 Scottish Premier League
 English FA Cup
 English Football League Cup
 World Cup
 European Championships
 Champions League
 Europa League

Football Analysts (FBA's)
During the early development stages, the initial idea was to employee ex-referees to act as Football Analysts, but this was soon dismissed in favour of  ex-professional Footballers. The most famous of which were Brendon Ormsby, Mel Sterland, Jimmy Case, Neil Webb , John Sitton , Imre Varadi , Brian Kilcline , Gary Chivers , Micky Gynn . All the FBA's were supplied and managed by the Professional Football Association (PFA), with day-to-day responsibility lying with Paul Allen and Chris "Jozza" Joslin from the PFA.

References

Computer systems
Statistical software